Sixte Coupal dit la Reine (May 1, 1825 – June 22, 1891) was a farmer and political figure in Lower Canada and Quebec, Canada. He represented Napierville in the House of Commons of Canada from 1867 to 1872 and from 1874 to 1882 as a Liberal member.

He was born Sixte Coupal in Saint-Cyprien-de-Léry, Lower Canada in 1825. He served as justice of the peace and also as mayor of Napierville. In 1863, he was elected to the Legislative Assembly of the Province of Canada for Napierville as a member of the parti rouge. He was elected again after Confederation but defeated in 1872 and 1874. He was elected in an 1874 by-election but the result was ruled invalid; he was reelected in the by-election that followed.

He died at Saint-Jovite in 1891.

External links

1825 births
1891 deaths
Members of the Legislative Assembly of the Province of Canada from Canada East
Liberal Party of Canada MPs
Members of the House of Commons of Canada from Quebec
Mayors of places in Quebec
Canadian justices of the peace